Rubel Sarsour (born August 7, 1983) is an Arab-Israeli footballer currently playing for F.C. Kafr Qasim.

Sarsour is mostly known for his time in Maccabi Petah Tikva, there he was part of the senior team for 9 years, played a total of 158 games and scored 35 goals.

His older brother Nor is also a footballer who played for Hapoel Bnei Lod and now both brothers play together in F.C. Kafr Qasim.

Honours
Israeli Premier League
Runner-up: 2004–05
 Toto Cup
Winner: 2003–04

References

External links
 
 

1983 births
Living people
Arab citizens of Israel
Arab-Israeli footballers
Israeli footballers
Israel under-21 international footballers
Israel youth international footballers
Maccabi Petah Tikva F.C. players
Hapoel Acre F.C. players
Hapoel Kfar Saba F.C. players
F.C. Kafr Qasim players
Liga Leumit players
Israeli Premier League players
Footballers from Kafr Qasim
Association football midfielders